Hakkı Harun Erdenay (born 27 May 1968 in Ankara) (nickname: "Pegasus") is a Turkish former professional basketball player, and former President of the Turkish Basketball Federation. As a player, he was famous for his spectacular 3-point shooting. At a height of 1.90 m (6'3") tall, he played in shooting guard and small forward positions.

Professional playing career
During his pro career, Erdenay was a three-time Top Scorer of the Turkish Super League, in 1990, 1993, and 2005.

National team playing career
Erdenay was a member of the senior Turkish national team. With Turkey, he played at the 1993 EuroBasket, the 1995 EuroBasket, the 1997 EuroBasket, the 2001 EuroBasket, and the 2002 FIBA World Championship. He won a silver medal at the 2001 EuroBasket.

Post-playing career
As the manager of the Turkish Basketball Federation (TBF), Erdenay managed the senior Turkish national basketball team at some of the following tournaments:

2006 FIBA World Championship: 6th place
2007 EuroBasket: 11th place
2009 EuroBasket: 8th place
2010 FIBA World Championship: 

He was elected the President of the Turkish Basketball Federation in 2015.

Personal life
His father, Kemal Erdenay, was also a former basketball player, and played with İTÜ and the senior Turkish national basketball team. Erdenay was married to Gergana Branzova, a Bulgarian former basketball player. They were married in 2003, and were divorced in 2014. They have three children.

Awards and accomplishments

Pro clubs
3× Turkish Super League Top Scorer: (1990, 1993, 1995)
2× Turkish Cup Winner: (1992, 2003)
3× Turkish Super League Champion: (1995, 1998, 2001)
3× Turkish Presidential Cup Winner: (1995, 2001, 2002)
Turkish All-Star Game: (2005, 2006)
Turkish All-Star Game 3 Point Shootout Champion: (2006)

Turkish senior national team
2001 EuroBasket:

References

External links 
 FIBA Profile
 FIBA Europe Profile
 Euroleague.net Profile
 TurkSports.Net Profile
 International Forum Page
 TBLStat.net Profile

1968 births
Living people
Fenerbahçe men's basketball players
İstanbul Teknik Üniversitesi B.K. players
Mersin Büyükşehir Belediyesi S.K. players
Paşabahçe S.K. players
Shooting guards
Small forwards
Turkish basketball coaches
Turkish men's basketball players
Ülker G.S.K. basketball players
2002 FIBA World Championship players